Edgardo Madinabeytia (28 August 1932 – 2002) was an Argentine football goalkeeper who won a number of championships with Atletico de Madrid of Spain in the 1960s.

Madinabeytia started his playing career in 1950 with Huracán of the Primera División Argentina he made over 100 appearances for the club before joining Atletico de Madrid in 1958. During his time with Atletico the club won La Liga once, three Copa del Rey and the 1961–62 European Cup Winners' Cup. He made a total of 237 appearances for the club in all competitions.

In 1967, he joined Real Murcia of the Segunda División where he played until his retirement in 1969.

Honours
 Atletico de Madrid
Copa del Rey: 1959–60, 1960–61, 1964–65
UEFA Cup Winners' Cup: 1961–62
La Liga: 1965–66

External links
 Edgardo Madinabeytia at LFP
 Edgardo Madinabeytia Profile at BDFutbol

1932 births
2002 deaths
Sportspeople from Buenos Aires Province
Argentine footballers
Association football goalkeepers
Club Atlético Huracán footballers
Atlético Madrid footballers
Real Murcia players
Argentine expatriate sportspeople in Spain
Expatriate footballers in Spain
Argentine people of Basque descent
La Liga players
Argentine Primera División players
Segunda División players